The 2015 South Dakota Coyotes football team represented the University of South Dakota in the 2015 NCAA Division I FCS football season. They were led by fourth year head coach Joe Glenn and played their home games in the DakotaDome. They were a member of the Missouri Valley Football Conference. They finished the season 5–6, 3–5 in MVFC play to finish in a three way tie for sixth place.

On November 23, head coach Joe Glenn retired. He finished at South Dakota with a four year record of 12–34.

Schedule

Source: Schedule

References

South Dakota
South Dakota Coyotes football seasons
South Dakota Coyotes football